Route 200E (or Airport bus) is a bus route in Budapest. The line currently runs between the Budapest Ferenc Liszt International Airport and Kőbánya-Kispest. At night it runs to Határ út metro station. The route is served by BKK and operated by BKV Zrt.

History
On 6 September 2008 as part of the BKV transit system overhaul, Route 200 was replaced by Route 200E. The new bus line did not stop at Billentyű utca stop. Between 21 June and 24 August in 2011 the buses ran to Határ út instead of Kőbánya-Kispest terminus. Since 30 May 2012 do not serve the closed Terminal 1 of Liszt ferenc International Airport. Route 200E stops at Billentyű utca since 1 May 2013. The passengers have to board at first door since October 5, 2013. The buses stop at the Aeropark Repülőmúzeum since 3 June 2017, and at Pestszentlőrinc vasútállomás (átjáró) since 19 March 2018.

As of June 2018, 200E operates continuously (24/7).

The bus line extended to Nagyvárad tér from 6 April 2019 to provides direct connection from the airport to the M3 metro line while its Nagyvárad tér–Kőbánya-Kispest section is under reconstruction.

Route

Stops and connections

References 

200E